Keyshia Myeshia Cole (née Johnson; born October 15, 1981) is an American singer, songwriter, and television personality. Born and raised in Oakland, California, Cole began her career as a backing vocalist for MC Hammer. After signing with A&M Records, she released her debut studio album, The Way It Is in 2005. The album was certified platinum by the Recording Industry Association of America (RIAA) and garnered two nominations at the 2006 Soul Train Music Awards. Cole starred in the BET reality television series Keyshia Cole: The Way It Is (2006–2008), which became one of the most-watched programs in the network's history. 

In 2007, Cole released her second studio album, Just Like You, which spawned three number-one R&B singles — "Let It Go" (featuring Missy Elliott and Lil' Kim), "I Remember" and "Heaven Sent" — and earned her four Grammy nominations. The album reached number two on Billboard 200 chart and was certified platinum by the RIAA. Her third album, A Different Me (2008), was met with generally positive reviews and became the second of her career to debut atop of the Top R&B/Hip-Hop Albums chart as well as number two on the Billboard 200. A commercial success, the album was certified platinum by the RIAA. 

Cole's fourth album, Calling All Hearts (2010), included the singles "I Ain't Thru" and "Take Me Away". Her fifth studio album, Woman to Woman (2012), peaked at number ten on the Billboard 200. It spawned the single "Enough of No Love", which peaked within the top-ten of the Hot R&B/Hip-Hop Songs chart. That same year, she starred in the reality series Keyshia & Daniel: Family First. Further label changes saw the release of Point of No Return (2014) under Interscope and 11:11 Reset (2017) under Epic. 

Dubbed by critics as the "Princess of Hip-Hop Soul", Cole is best known for her soulful voice. Her work has earned her numerous awards and accolades, including an ASCAP Award and a Billboard Music Award. From 2019 to 2020, she hosted the Fox Soul syndicated television talk show One on One with Keyshia Cole.

Early life
Keyshia Myeshia Johnson was born on October 15, 1981, in Oakland, California, and is the biological daughter of Francine "Frankie" Lons (1960-2021) and boxing trainer Virgil Hunter. Cole is mixed of African-American and Mexican heritage. Her biological mother was addicted to alcohol and crack cocaine. She was adopted at the age of two by family friends Leon and Yvonne Cole, changing her last name to Cole. At the age of 12, Cole was introduced into the music industry, along with her brother Sean (also known as Nutt-So), where she met and recorded with MC Hammer.

She later formed a friendship with Tupac Shakur, who promised to help her start her singing career after asking her to write a hook on his then-upcoming project on the night he got shot in a drive-by shooting unexpectedly, which caused his death six days later. At the age of 16, Cole became a participant at the East Oakland Youth Development Center (EOYDC), a local youth organization. Cole moved to Los Angeles at the age of 18 to pursue a music career. During this time, Cole collaborated with artists from her native Bay Area, among them D'Wayne Wiggins of Tony Toni Tone and Messy Marv. In 2002, she was introduced to A&M Records A&R Ron Fair, whom signed her to the label and began mentoring her after listening to an unfinished version of one of her songs.

Career

2004–2006: The Way It Is

In March 2004, Cole's debut single, "Never", a collaboration with American rapper Eve, was released as the lead single from the soundtrack to Kevin Rodney Sullivan's comedy film Barbershop 2: Back in Business (2004).
On November 9, 2004, Cole released her first single from "The Way It Is" entitled "I Changed My Mind" featuring Kanye West. The radio remix, featuring then-incarcerated rapper Shyne reached #71 in the US.
Her second single from the album, "(I Just Want It) To Be Over", was released on April 5, 2005, and reached number one on the Bubbling Under Hot 100 (101).
Cole completed her debut album in early 2005. In anticipation, Cole and DJ Green Lantern released a mixtape entitled "Team Invasion Presents Keyshia Cole" in February 2005 featuring remixes of hip-hop instrumentals and snippets of songs from her album. It featured appearances by Remy Ma, Fat Joe, and Ghostface Killah.
The Way It Is was released on June 21, 2005. It debuted at number six on the Billboard 200, selling 89,000 copies in the first week of release.
It has since sold over 2 million copies worldwide, receiving a platinum certification from the RIAA.
The third single from the album, "I Should Have Cheated" was released on August 3, 2005, and reached number 30 on the Hot 100. The fourth single, "Love" was released on January 6, 2006, and reached 19 on the Hot 100 and number one on the US Hot R&B/Hip-Hop Songs. It has been certified platinum by the RIAA and is regarded as Cole's "breakthrough single".

2007–2009: Just like You and A Different Me

Cole began work on the second album in early 2006. She was featured on the single "Last Night" by Diddy from his album Press Play which also ended up being on her second LP. The recording of the album was documented on the second season of her reality TV show Keyshia Cole: The Way It Is. After A&M Records folded through a merger with Octone Records in early 2007, Cole was drafted by the Universal Music Group and Interscope Records boss Jimmy Iovine to its subsidiary label Geffen Records, the same de facto record label trade done on rapper The Game from Interscope to Geffen, a year earlier, to avoid his contractual obligations with his former rival, 50 Cent, and his crew, G-Unit. Now under Geffen, Cole released her second album, Just Like You on September 25, 2007. The album debuted at number two on the US Billboard 200 chart, selling 281,000 copies in its first week. After four months of release, the album was certified platinum by the RIAA, just like her debut, and has since sold 1.7 million copies in the US alone.
Preceded by the number one hit single "Let It Go" featuring Missy Elliott and Lil' Kim, "Let It Go" has sold over one million copies in the US and has been certified platinum by the RIAA.
The second single "Shoulda Let You Go" featuring Amina Harris, fared well on charts peaking at number seven on the US R&B/Hip-Hop Songs The album's final single Heaven Sent, followed in the previous singles success. "Heaven Sent" is Cole's third number one on the US Billboard Hot R&B/Hip-Hop Songs from Just Like You. It peaked at number one for nine consecutive weeks. It charted on the US Billboard Hot R&B/Hip Hop Songs chart for 55 weeks. On the Billboard Hot 100, it has peaked at number 28. The album's third single I Remember, reached number one on the Billboard Hot R&B/Hip-Hop Songs chart and peaked at number 24 on the Billboard Hot 100. Cole received a variety of nominations for the album, including four Grammys, Best Contemporary R&B Album, and Best Rap/Sung Collaboration at the 2008 Grammy Awards and Best Female R&B Vocal Performance and Best R&B Song at the 2009 Grammy Awards.

Cole was also featured on Jaheim's single "I've Changed", from his album The Makings of a Man and Keith Sweat's Love You Better, which was featured on his album Just Me and the soundtrack to Why Did I Get Married? Additionally, Cole was scheduled to make a cameo on Missy Elliott's album, Block Party.
In early to mid-2008, Cole made several guest appearances on songs such as "I Got a Thang for You" with rapper Trina, "Boyfriend/Girlfriend" with Atlanta hip hop group C-Side, and "Game's Pain" with west-coast native The Game. The third season of Keyshia Cole: The Way It Is premiered in October 2008 on BET. The 10-episode season followed up the last season following Keyshia's family and giving a look into her third studio album, A Different Me. The series concluded on December 16, 2008.

Cole released "A Different Me" on December 16, 2008. It had its debut at number two on the US Billboard 200, selling 322,000 copies in its first week. The album has gone on to sell over 1,020,000 copies in the US, and has received a platinum certification from the RIAA. The album was preceded by lead single "Playa Cardz Right", with a posthumous feature from Oakland-native and past mentor, Tupac Shakur. It was released on October 28, 2008, and reached number 63 on the Hot 100. The second single from the album, "You Complete Me", was released to radio in December 2008 and reached number 62 on the Hot 100. Cole released the third and final single from the album, "Trust", a duet with Monica, on May 5, 2009, which reached number five on the Billboard Hot R&B/Hip-Hop Songs chart.
To promote the album and single, Cole embarked on her first headlining tour, A Different Me Tour in summer 2009. Throughout this time, Cole was featured as the cover artist on several magazines such as the March 2009 issue of Vibe, WordUp!, the Summer 2009 final double-cover issue of King, and the June issue of Sister 2 Sister with her mother Yvonne Cole. With more collaborations along the way with Keri Hilson on her debut LP R. Kelly's single "Number One" along with T-Pain, and Gucci Mane on his own LP "The State vs Radric Davis", she began work on her fourth studio album.

2010–2013: Calling All Hearts and Woman to Woman

 
Three months after the birth of her son, on June 27, 2010, Cole returned to the music industry, filling in for Hayley Williams to sing the chorus to B.o.B's "Airplanes (Part II)" featuring Eminem during the 2010 BET Awards. Over a year after Cole announced the beginning production of her fourth studio album, she released her first single, "I Ain't Thru", featuring Young Money Entertainment rap star, Nicki Minaj, on October 15, 2010, her birthday. Although not a big hit on the charts and later revealed as a regret as a single choice by Cole, fans loved the single and viewed it as a great comeback along with credits.
Her fourth studio album, Calling All Hearts was released on December 21, 2010, featuring collaborations from Timbaland, Nicki Minaj, Tank, and Faith Evans. It also featured Cole's mother Dr. Yvonne Cole on a gospel track inspired by Faith as well. With opening sales of 128,000 copies, she released Imani Entertainment as her management shortly after. The album has gone on to sell over 500,000 copies since its release, although it hasn't been riaa certified gold yet. She performed the promotional single, "Long Way Down" on The Tonight Show with Jay Leno, The Wendy Williams Show, and 106 & Park, in which a 30-minute concert by her was performed. In February 2011, Cole released her third single from "Calling All Hearts", "Take Me Away", to urban radio as a fan choice, which was released on December 21, 2010. Cole performed the single on January 19, 2011, on Conan. The single's video, directed by Taj Stansberry, premiered on VEVO on April 18, 2011, and was also released on 106 & Park later that day. The song has since then peaked on the Billboard US Hot R&B/Hip-Hop Songs at number 27.

On January 17, 2011, Cole tweeted "Would like for u guys to know that Manny Halley is no longer my management", followed by "Someone said if the people around u won't change, change the people around you." This happened shortly after the decline of opening week sales of Cole's album Calling All Hearts. She also disclosed that recent business disagreements also played part in their departure. This is Cole's first album to be released without Halley, as he was with her at the beginning of her career.

Cole started development on her fifth studio album shortly after she came out with her fourth album (Calling All Hearts). She began production on the project working first with writers Ester Dean and Betty Wright. She also collaborated with producers Boi-1da, Cool & Dre, Bangladesh, J.U.S.T.I.C.E. League, Toxic, Mave, and Earl Powell. This is her first project to be released without A&R executive Ron Fair. Her fifth studio album, Woman to Woman was released on November 19, 2012. The album debuted at number 10 on the Billboard 200 selling 96,000 copies in its first week in the United States, becoming Cole's fifth consecutive top 10 album. In its second week, the album rose to number three, where it sold 37,100 copies. In its third week, the album fell two spots to number five, selling 28,600 copies. The album has sold over 246,300 copies as of January 2013.

The lead single from Woman to Woman , "Enough of No Love", featuring YMCMB rapper and past collaborator, Lil Wayne was sent to radio and released for digital download on July 3, 2012. The song was written by Redd Stylez and Cole, and was produced by Harmony with a mid-tempo R&B production.  It peaked at number seven on the Billboard R&B/Hip-Hop Songs Chart. On August 9, 2012, the song debuted at number 94 on the Billboard Hot 100 where it ultimately peaked at number 84.

The second single, "Trust and Believe" was released for digital download on October 22, 2012 and again on November 13, 2012. On October 24, it was ranked the number one added song to Urban radio of the week.
"I Choose You" was released as the third single during August 2013. Cole embarked on her third headlining concert tour, in support of her fifth studio album, Woman to Woman. Visiting North America and Europe the tour held 27 total dates. Singer Chrisette Michele was the supporting act for the North American leg.

In September 2013, after Geffen folded, Cole's Geffen deal was, once again, drafted, this time to its parent label, Interscope Records. She later returned to the studio and began recording her sixth studio album. On October 2, 2013, it was confirmed that Keyshia Cole and her former manager Manny Halley had resolved their differences & Halley was currently managing Keyshia Cole again.

2014–2017: Point of No Return and 11:11 Reset

The lead single from Cole's sixth studio album, "Next Time (Won't Give My Heart Away)" was released as a digital download, on March 31, 2014, and officially impacted US Rhythmic radio on April 1, 2014. In March 2014, Cole revealed the title of her sixth studio album to be Point of No Return. "Rick James", featuring rapper Juicy J, was released alongside "Next Time (Won't Give My Heart Away)" as a digital download in March 2014, while "She" followed as the third single from the album on July 8, 2014. The album was released on October 7, 2014, with open sales of 25,000 copies & has sold over 100,000 copies.

In February 2015, Cole revealed to Rap-Up TV that following the release of Point of No Return, which sold poorly, she was contractually free from Interscope and was intending on moving forward as an independent recording artist. She also confirmed work on her seventh studio album, confirming she was halfway done with ten tracks so far, stating: "I don't know which direction I wanna go in. I don't know if I want it to be more fun, I don't know if I want it to be more heartfelt or if I want it upbeat, medium to slow. I'm just recording and recording and recording and recording and recording and recording and recording."

In December 2016, it was announced that Cole signed a new record deal with Sony's Epic Records.

On January 27, 2017, Cole released the lead single "You" (featuring Remy Ma and French Montana) from her seventh studio album. In an interview with Rap-Up magazine, she announced the name of the album, 11:11 Reset, stating "For the past year, I've been seeing 1111 constantly and to my understanding, you're aligned spiritually with your destiny and everything that is meant to be in your life is happening at the right time. The timing is right. Everything is right. Reset is definitely cohesive with that." On August 25, 2017, she released the second single "Incapable". The album was released on October 20, 2017. It sold 15,000 copies within the first week. This mark's Coles lowest first week ever. Since then the album has sold around 100,000 copies.

2018–present: Upcoming eighth studio album 
In 2019, Cole was featured on "All Me" by Kehlani. That same year she started hosting her own talk show, One on One with Keyshia Cole, airing on Fox Soul. In June 2020, it was reported that Keyshia Cole had signed a management deal with talent management company Primary Wave which was shortly after the reveal that she had reunited with longtime friend and record producer who she worked with for her first four albums, Ron Fair. On July 22, speculations came out about a possible Verzuz battle between Cole and Ashanti after Cole publicly challenged her during the live streamed match between rappers DMX and Snoop Dogg. On December 2, Cole announced via her Instagram Live that she would soon be competing in a match while singing a few of her previous records. Two days later, it was confirmed that the latest Verzuz battle would be between Cole and Ashanti. The in-person competition was expected to take place on December 12, 2020, though it was postponed after Ashanti tested positive for COVID-19 ahead of the event. Following the Verzuz battle, Cole released the non-album single "I Don't Wanna Be in Love", under her independent record label, Hearts and Stars, created with the support of BMG.

Other ventures

Reality television
In July 2006, Cole premiered her 6 episode docu-series, titled Keyshia Cole: The Way It Is, on BET. With record breaking views, the show viewed Cole's life as an artist, daughter, and sister, performing, visiting her home town, and starting production on her next album.

In mid-July 2011, Cole tweeted that she, her husband Daniel, and James DeBose will be launching a new reality TV show, entitled Keyshia & Daniel: Family First. Shooting of the show began during the summer of 2011. During the 8 episode docu-series, Cole will be crafting her follow-up to Calling All Hearts. "I just kind of lay out all my emotions then we start from there" says Cole. "I usually work with big name producers and stuff like once all from my heart and soul is out that I need to get out." Aside from a look into the making of her new album, currently titled Woman to Woman, Cole and her husband, Daniel, re-wed during taping. The first episode of the show aired on BET on October 9, 2012, with 2.9 million viewers. In November 2014, BET confirmed that Keyshia Cole is back with her third reality TV show Keyshia Cole: All In; which was originally slated to premiere during Fall 2014, but aired on February 24, 2015. In 2019, BET announced and confirmed that Keyshia Cole is back with a fourth reality show Keyshia Cole: My New Life, which premiered November 2019.

Shoe line with Steve Madden
Cole announced that she was teaming up with fashion designer Steve Madden to create her own shoe collection, specifically high heels, wedges, and boots. "I am super excited to collaborate with Steve Madden," stated Cole. "It's something I've wanted to do for a long time. I love his style and I think we came up with an amazing vibrant collection. We have something for every fashion diva!"

Personal life
In May 2009, Cole began dating former NBA player Daniel Gibson. They were engaged on January 1, 2010. On March 2, 2010, they welcomed their first child, a son. They wed on May 21, 2011 and renewed their vows in September 2011 in Hawaii. "My husband wanted me to have my dream wedding so he flew all of our family members here. He's giving me something I will never forget! Amazing," Cole said. The entire wedding weekend was filmed and aired on their new BET reality TV series Keyshia and Daniel: Family First, on October 9 and 16, 2012. On March 21, 2014, during an interview, Cole announced and confirmed that she and Gibson had broken up, but they have not yet filed for divorce. In May 2016, she met her biological father, Virgil Hunter, after a paternity test confirmed their connection. In April 2017, Cole had announced that she and Gibson were divorcing. In an Instagram post on September 3, 2020, Cole announced that she and Gibson were officially divorced.
On May 3, 2019, Cole announced via her Instagram that she was expecting her second child, a son, with her then boyfriend, Niko Khale. Cole welcomed her second son on August 1, 2019. In October 2020, Cole and Khale split up. Cole's mother, Frankie Lons died on July 19, 2021. Her cause of death was revealed to have been a drug overdose.

Artistry
Cole possesses the vocal range of a soprano. Her voice has been described as having a "flexible range of R&B, the muscular punch of soul and the hard character of hip hop" and contains a "smoky flavor, and a husky texture." Cole's musical themes and lyrics touch upon the topics of empowerment, reflection, heartache and love. Coles fifth studio album "Woman to Woman" (2012) was described by
Ben Ratliff of The New York Times as a R&B almanac of shaky romance, with nearly every song a first-person narrative with gnarled details, endlessly recombining data about suspicion, jealousy, pride, punishment, self-respect, the led-up, the aftermath." The album's lyrics revolved around "emotionally painful romantic issues." Betty Wright listed Cole as one of the artists who she believed were "still holding the torch" for R&B music.

Influences
Cole grew up listening to her mentor Tupac Shakur. Cole cites Mary J. Blige as one of her greatest musical inspirations, along with R&B singers Faith Evans, Toni Braxton, Monica, Chanté Moore and Brandy.

Controversies 
A feud between Cole and Lil' Mo began in August 2005 via the radio series Star and Buc Wild Morning Show. Mo was reported to have dismissed the vocal talent of a new crop of R&B performers, saying that they relied on dancing. Cole took offense and went to Dream Hotel in New York City, where she encountered Lil' Mo's manager Phil Thornton and a stylist, allegedly stating "You all are traitors. [Lil' Mo] is the enemy.". Lil' Mo shrugged off the incident, saying she was told that Cole was intoxicated at the time, which Cole denied.

On March 16, 2012, Cole came at Gucci Mane for the controversial song "Truth", on which Gucci rapped, "I did a song with Keyshia Cole and I know you still miss her. But Puff was f---ing her while you was falling in love with her." implying that, during the time of her rumored relationship with Young Jeezy, Cole was cheating on Jeezy with rap mogul and her "Last Night" collaborator Diddy. Cole stated on the radio, "Putting all ya trust in some of these 'Hood Rappers'... How you gonna be a G, and you spreading lies, to sell mix tapes! Where ya talent at. Dude ain't have to lie though! Could've kept me out of it."

In March 2013, Cole was criticized by urban media outlets for her Twitter critique of Beyoncé's "Bow Down/I Been On". This led to Lil' Mo and Cole exchanging hostile tweets over the next few days. Despite the exchanges, in May 2013, Mo said there was no beef between her and Cole, which led to the two exchanging hostile messages again via Instagram and Twitter.

Discography

 The Way It Is (2005)
 Just like You (2007)
 A Different Me (2008)
 Calling All Hearts (2010)
 Woman to Woman (2012)
 Point of No Return (2014)
 11:11 Reset (2017)

Tours
Headlining
 A Different Me Tour (2009)
 Woman to Woman Tour (2013)
 Point of No Return Tour (2014)

Supporting
 Sweatsuit Tour (supporting Nelly) (2005)
 Touch the Sky Tour (supporting Kanye West) (2005)
 Double Up Tour (supporting R. Kelly) (2007)
 I Am Music Tour (supporting Lil Wayne) (2008)
 Love Letter Tour (supporting R. Kelly) (2011)

Filmography

References

External links

 Official website
 

 
1981 births
Living people
American film actresses
21st-century American actresses
African-American women singer-songwriters
African-American record producers
Record producers from California
American adoptees
American sopranos
Participants in American reality television series
Musicians from Oakland, California
American hip hop singers
African-American actresses
American women pop singers
Singer-songwriters from California
American contemporary R&B singers
21st-century African-American women singers
American women record producers
American women hip hop musicians
American musicians of Mexican descent
Hispanic and Latino American musicians